Richard Colley may refer to:

 Richard Colley (rugby league),rugby league player of the 2000s
 Richard Colley (cricketer) (1833–1902), English cricketer and British Army officer
 Richard Bowen Colley (1819–1875), mayor of Glenelg, South Australia